David Gray (8 February 1922 – 17 May 2008) was a Scottish professional footballer who played league football for Blackburn Rovers between 1948 and 1953, making over 200 appearances. He also played football with Preston North End and Rangers, Dundee and Dundee United in Scotland. After retirement from playing, Gray had a spell as Forfar Athletic manager.

References

1922 births
2008 deaths
Scottish footballers
Lochee Harp F.C. players
Rangers F.C. players
Preston North End F.C. players
Blackburn Rovers F.C. players
Dundee F.C. players
Dundee United F.C. players
Scottish Football League players
English Football League players
Scottish football managers
Forfar Athletic F.C. managers
Scottish Football League managers
Association football fullbacks